The Case Swedish Open 2014 is the 2014's Swedish Open, which is a tournament of the PSA World Tour event International (prize money: $70,000). The event took place in Linköping in Sweden from 6 February to 9 February. Nick Matthew won his fourth Swedish Open trophy, beating Ramy Ashour in the final.

Prize money and ranking points
For 2014, the prize purse was $70,000. The prize money and points breakdown is as follows:

Seeds

Draw and results

See also
PSA World Tour 2014
Swedish Open (squash)

References

External links
PSA Case Swedish Open 2014 website
Case Swedish Open official website
Case Swedish Open SquashSite website

Squash tournaments in Sweden
Swedish Open Squash
2014 in Swedish sport